The 2012 2. divisjon season began on 14 April 2012 and ended on 27 October 2012. The league consisted of 56 teams divided into 4 groups of 14 teams. The four group-winners, Elverum, Kristiansund, Vard Haugesund and Follo was promoted to the 1. divisjon, while the bottom three teams in each groups was relegated to the 3. divisjon.

Teams
Asker, Løv-Ham (replaced by Fyllingsdalen), Nybergsund-Trysil and Randaberg were relegated from the 2011 1. divisjon, while Ullensaker/Kisa, Bærum, Notodden and Tromsdalen were promoted to the 2012 1. divisjon.

Tiller, Strindheim, Steinkjer, Herd, Jevnaker, Viking 2, Førde, Austevoll, Harstad, Hasle-Løren, Skarp along with Manglerud Star, who withdrew their team, were relegated from 2011 2. Divisjon.

Østsiden, Gjøvik FF, Grorud, Birkebeineren, Jerv, Egersund, Brann 2, Fana, Træff, Buvik, Mo and Finnsnes were promoted from 2011 3. Divisjon as winners of their groups.

League tables

Group 1

Group 2

Group 3

Group 4

Notes

References 

Norwegian Second Division seasons
3
Norway
Norway